Haman  is the main antagonist in the Book of Esther and the Jewish holiday of Purim.

Haman may also refer to:

Haman, a subtribe of the Tangsa, who live in Myanmar
Haman County, South Korea
Haman Station, a railway station
Haman Stadium, used mostly for football matches
Haman Formation, South Korea, a geological formation

People
Haman is a Semitic given name and a surname.

Religious figures:
Haman (Islam), Pharaoh's minister mentioned in the Quran

People
Haman Daouda (born 1989), Cameroonian footballer
Haman Sadjo (born 1984), Cameroonian footballer
Jacques Haman (born 1994), Cameroonian footballer
Kató Hámán (1884–1936), Hungarian Esperanto and Communist activist
Radek Haman (born 1969), Czech ice hockey player

Fictional characters:
Haman Karn, a main character in anime ZZ Gundam and the manga Char's Deleted Affair: Portrait of a Young Comet

See also 
 Hanan, a Semitic name
 Hamann, a German surname